The 1938 Vermont gubernatorial election took place on November 8, 1938. Incumbent Republican George Aiken ran successfully for re-election to a second term as Governor of Vermont, defeating Democratic candidate Fred C. Martin.

Republican primary

Results

Democratic primary

Results

General election

Results

References

Vermont
1938
Gubernatorial
November 1938 events